Reichian therapy can refer to several schools of thought and therapeutic techniques whose common touchstone is their origins in the work of psychoanalyst Wilhelm Reich (1897–1957).  Some examples are:

Character Analysis, the analysis of character structures that act in the form of resistances of the ego.
Bioenergetic analysis, which combines psychological analysis, active work with the body and relational therapeutic work.
Body psychotherapy, which addresses the body and the mind as a whole with emphasis on the reciprocal relationships within body and mind.
Neo-Reichian massage, whose practitioners attempt to locate and dissolve body armoring (also called "holding patterns").
Vegetotherapy, a form of psychotherapy that involves the physical manifestations of emotions.

Wilhelm Reich